A separable filter in image processing can be written as product of two more simple filters.
Typically a 2-dimensional convolution operation is separated into two 1-dimensional filters.

Examples 
1. A two-dimensional smoothing filter:

2. Another two-dimensional smoothing filter with stronger weight in the middle:

3. The Sobel operator, used commonly for edge detection:

This works also for the Prewitt operator.

In the examples, there is a cost of 3 multiply–accumulate operations for each vector which gives six total (horizontal and vertical).  This is compared to the nine operations for the full 3x3 matrix.

References

Image processing